Cousins Properties Incorporated is a publicly traded real estate investment trust (REIT) that invests in office buildings in Atlanta, Charlotte, Austin, Phoenix, Tampa, and Chapel Hill, North Carolina. The company has developed notable properties including CNN Center, Omni Coliseum, 191 Peachtree Tower, and Emory Point in Atlanta.

As of December 31, 2019, the company owned wholly or through joint ventures 38 properties comprising 21,767,000 square feet.

History
The company was founded in 1958 by Tom Cousins.

In 1962, the company became a public company via an initial public offering.

In 1965, the company built an office building in downtown Atlanta.

In the 1970s, the company expanded into regional malls, real estate finance, and insurance but pared back after the economy softened.

In 1987, Tom Cousins formed the Cousins Foundation and funded it with stock in the company.

In 2002, Thomas Cousins retired from his position as CEO, but remained chairman of the board of directors until the end of 2006, at which time he retired. R. Dary Stone also stepped down from the president and COO positions in 2002.

In 2004, the company partnered with Jim Wilson and Associates, Inc. to develop The Avenue at Carriage Crossing.

In 2006, the company sold Frost Bank Tower, which it developed in 2004, to EQ Office for $188 million. The company also sold Bank of America Plaza in Atlanta for $436 million. In 2012, the building was sold at a foreclosure auction for $235 million.

In 2013, the company acquired Park Oak Central Tower. It also acquired Greenway Plaza for $950 million.

In 2016, the company sold 191 Peachtree Tower for $268 million. The company also sold The Points at Waterview for $26.8 million and North Point Center East for $92.3 million.

In 2016, the company acquired Parkway Properties and spun off its Houston assets into Parkway, Inc.

In 2017, the company sold the American Cancer Society Building in Atlanta for $166 million.

References

External links

1958 establishments in Georgia (U.S. state)
1960s initial public offerings
Companies based in Atlanta
Companies listed on the New York Stock Exchange
Financial services companies established in 1958
Real estate investment trusts of the United States